Project Vesta is a public benefit corporation that researches and carries out accelerated weathering of the mineral  olivine as a climate drawdown strategy to capture carbon in the world’s oceans. They are focused on increasing the volume and quality of the scientific evidence behind accelerated weathering, in order to make it an economically viable opportunity for atmospheric carbon removal. Vesta claims that their goal is US$10 a ton for reaching economic viability, but some critics do not think this is viable. Executive director Tom Green claims "If we spread olivine over 2% of the world’s shelf sea, then that will be enough to capture 100% of human emissions.” In 2022, Grace Andrews represented Project Vesta in the climate documentary "Solving for Zero" written by Bill Gates.

History 
In 2019, Kelly Erhart co-founded the company as a nonprofit headquartered in San Francisco.  In 2021, the organization changed from a non-profit to public benefit corporation.
Vesta announced in May 2020, that they began a controlled trials of the approach in two private beaches in the Caribbean and are looking for other sites to experiment.  The experiment was funded by a mix of crowdfunding, grants and carbon capture credits by companies like Stripe who purchased 3,333 tons of carbon sequestration for $75 a ton. In 2009, one paper contended that the process is not economically viable at the scale needed to make a meaningful impact in carbon dioxide sequestration.  In 2020, the director of Project Vesta said that if the process could be done for $10 a ton, the project would be widely accepted by the markets and the public, especially as climate change became worse. 

In 2021, the company calculated that spreading olivine in 0.25% of the world's shelf seas will remove one billion tons of  carbon dioxide from the atmosphere.  The company said in 2022 it could remove carbon dioxide from the atmosphere at a rate of $35 a ton if the process is scaled up to the  gigatonnes.

In 2022, the town of  Southampton, New York, in collaboration with Stony Brook University, and   Cornell University’s Cooperative Extension, and Project Vesta, began a pilot project to place 500 cubic yards of olivine on a Southampton beach that has been eroding as sea levels rise. As part of the pilot and other experiments, the company monitored whether their approach releases concentrations of toxins from the olivine.

Process
Project Vesta is testing whether the olivine weathering process will mitigate  coastal recession and reduce ocean acidification. 
The Project Vesta process mimics natural weathering processes to transform the olivine into silicates and other stable chemicals, like calcium carbonate which precipitate to the oceans bottoms as marine life consumes the naturally occurring chemical and die (see Carbon in the water cycle for further info). The wave action of beaches on crushed olivine allows for more rapid weathering than other natural deposits of olivine, which only absorb limited amounts of carbon dioxide. 

Since the olivine weathering process creates molecular byproducts such as calcium carbonate that could alkalinize acidifying seawater or release metals such as bioavailable nickel, the organization also researches chemical composition and toxicology of affected water and aquatic life. Project Vesta publishes their scientific findings and as of May 2020 made their methods open source.

References

External links 

 
 Reversing Climate Change Podcast Season 2 Episode 23 on Project Vesta

Organizations based in San Francisco
Enhanced weathering